Mimi of Decorse, also known as Mimi of Gaudefroy-Demombynes and Mimi-D, is a language of Chad that is attested only in a word list labelled "Mimi" that was collected ca. 1900 by G. J. Decorse and published by Maurice Gaudefroy-Demombynes. Joseph Greenberg (1960) classified it as a Maban language, like the rather remote Maban relative Mimi of Nachtigal. However, George Starostin (2011) rejects this classification, arguing that similarities to Maban are due to contact with locally dominant Maba (the similarities are with that language specifically, not with the entire Maban family), and provisionally regards it as a language isolate, though it is suggestive of Central Sudanic.

Basic vocabulary
The more stable of Mimi-D and Mimi-N's attested vocabulary is as follows:

See also
Mimi of Nachtigal
Mimi of Decorse word list (Wiktionary)

References

Maban languages
Languages of Chad
Nilo-Saharan languages
Language isolates of Africa
Languages attested from the 1900s
Extinct languages of Africa